Project Runway All Stars (season 6) is the sixth season of the Project Runway spin-off series Project Runway All Stars. The concept of the edition is Rookies vs. Vets. It features sixteen designers, eight of whom have previously competed on Project Runway All Stars, and eight of whom are part of Project Runway All Stars for the first time. Alyssa Milano will return as host and both Georgina Chapman and Isaac Mizrahi will return as judges for this season, along with one or two guest judges each week. The show premiered on January 4, 2018 on Lifetime.

Judges
In addition to Alyssa Milano both Georgina Chapman and Isaac Mizrahi return as judges for this season. The mentor for this season is Anne Fulenwider. Some of the celebrity guest judges for Project Runway All Stars Season 6 are Jesse Tyler Ferguson, Olivia Culpo, Dita Von Teese, Fashion Designers Rebecca Minkoff, Michael Costello, Danielle Brooks of Orange Is the New Black, Kacey Musgraves, Catherine Zeta-Jones, Whoopi Goldberg, Rosie Perez, Karolina Kurkova,    legendary supermodel Carmen Dell'Orefice, and Project Runway All Stars mentor in season 3 to season 5 Zanna Roberts Rassi, Project Runway’s Nina Garcia and Zac Posen, and Project Runway Junior’s Kelly Osbourne, as well as RuPaul.

Designers
Names, locales and ages at time of competition per official site:

Designer Progress 

  The designer won Project Runway All Stars: Season 6.
  The designer won the challenge.
  The designer came in second but did not win the challenge.
  The designer had one of the highest scores for that challenge, but did not win.
  The designer had one of the lowest scores for that challenge, but was not eliminated.
  The designer was in the bottom two, but was not eliminated.
  The designer lost and was eliminated from the competition.

Episodes 
Sources:

Episode 1: Rookies vs Vets 
Original airdate: January 4, 2018

Eight all-star Rookies and eight returning all-star Veterans battle to create cohesive collections in the biggest season in All Stars’ history.

 Challenge: Create a fall or spring collection in rookies vs. vets teams
 Guest Judge: Michael Costello
 WINNER: Merline
 ELIMINATED: Casanova

Episode 2: Damsels in Distress 
Original airdate: January 11, 2018

Designers tear, dye and burn to create distressed fashion for a post-apocalyptic runway.

 Challenge: Create a distressed look for a post-apocalyptic runway
 Guest Judge: Danielle Brooks
 WINNER: Anthony
 ELIMINATED: Kelly

Episode 3: Perfect Pairings 
Original airdate: January 18, 2018

Designers pair up to create fashion inspired by food and wine pairings. Whoopi Goldberg joins the judges for All Stars’ first ever double elimination.

 Challenge: Create complementary looks inspired by a food and wine pairing
 Guest Judge: Whoopi Goldberg
 WINNER: Fabio & Ken
 ELIMINATED: Melissa & Ari

Episode 4: Balls Out! 
Original airdate: January 25, 2018

In the notorious unconventional challenge, designers use all types of balls to create modern day "ball gowns."
 Challenge: Create "ball gowns" made from balls for a modern day princess
 Guest Judge: Kacey Musgraves
 WINNER: Stanley
 ELIMINATED: Candice

Episode 5: Fashion's New Superheroes 
Original airdate: February 1, 2018

Designers create looks to celebrate a woman’s inner superhero.
 Challenge: Create superhero looks inspired by Rodial's Hero cosmetic products
 Guest Judge: Karolina Kurkova
 WINNER: Fabio
 ELIMINATED: Amanda

Episode 6: Thrown for a Loop by Betty Boop 
Original airdate: February 8, 2018

Betty Boop joins Alyssa on the runway to challenge the designers to create young, chic Hollywood looks.
 Challenge: Create a young, chic Hollywood look for a modern Betty Boop
 Guest Judge: Rebecca Minkoff
 WINNER: Joshua
 ELIMINATED: Char

Episode 7: A Kick in the Astro
Original airdate: February 22, 2018

RuPaul and Jesse Tyler Ferguson join the judging panel for a spectacular avant-garde runway.

 Challenge: Create an avant-garde look inspired by the cosmos
 Guest Judge: Jesse Tyler Ferguson & RuPaul
 WINNER: Stanley
 ELIMINATED: Kimberly

Episode 8: Mizrahi Madness
Original airdate: March 1, 2018

Isaac Mizrahi's exhibit serves as inspiration for colorful party looks; legendary supermodel Carmen Dell'Orefice serves as a guest judge.

 Challenge: Create a spring party look using a dominant and complementary color
 Guest Judge: Carmen Dell'Orefice 
 WINNER: Stanley
 ELIMINATED: Merline

Episode 9: Posen on the Red Carpet
Original airdate: March 8, 2018

Zac Posen invites the designers into his personal studio to gather material for red carpet looks that showcase a signature technique.

 Challenge: Create a red carpet look showcasing your signature technique
 Guest Judge: Rosie Perez & Zac Posen
 WINNER: Anthony
 ELIMINATED: Joshua

Episode 10: Rock Your Face Off
Original airdate: March 15, 2018

The designers face off against one another to create performance wear for a music superstar.

 Challenge: Create an outfit for a pop, rock or country performance
 Guest Judge: Olivia Culpo
 Guest mentor: Rebecca Minkoff
 WINNER: Edmond
 ELIMINATED: Helen

Episode 11: Nina's Crushing It
Original airdate: March 22, 2018

Nina Garcia challenges the designers to create resort wear inspired by different Candy Crush lands.

 Challenge: Create a resort wear look inspired by different lands in the Candy Crush kingdom
 Guest Judge: Nina Garcia & Kelly Osbourne
 WINNER: Ken
 ELIMINATED: Edmond

Episode 12: History in the Making
Original airdate: March 29, 2018

At the Smithsonian  in Washington , D.C., designers are challenged to create six-piece collections; a surprise runway sends one designer home early.
 Challenge: Create a six-piece collection to make your mark in American Fashion History
 Twist: Create a signature look for an exclusive runway presentation
 Guest Judge:  Dita Von Teese & Zanna Roberts Rassi 
 ADVANCED: Stanley, Fabio, & Anthony
 ELIMINATED: Ken

Episode 13: Making Fashion History 
Original airdate: April 5, 2018

The final three designers race to create seven-piece collections that make their mark in fashion history; guest judges Catherine Zeta-Jones and Zac Posen.
 Challenge: Create a seven-piece collection to make your mark in American fashion history
 Guest Judge: Catherine Zeta-Jones & Zac Posen
 WINNER: Anthony
 ELIMINATED: Fabio & Stanley

References

External links 
 Project Runway All Stars Official Website
 

All Stars Season 06
2018 American television seasons